Willy Eisenschitz (27 October 1889 – 8 July 1974) was a French painter of Austrian origin who mostly represented the landscapes of Provence and Drome in particular. His works are presented in a dozen European museums, and are the subject of retrospective exhibitions from 1957 to 2006.

References

1889 births
1974 deaths
French people of Austrian descent
French male painters
French landscape painters
19th-century French male artists